Hogrefe Publishing Group (formerly Verlag Hans Huber) is an international company that publishes academic journals and books in the fields of psychology and psychiatry. The group now includes publishing companies in fifteen countries. It has been publishing journals in North America in the 1970s, where its local division, Hogrefe Publishing Corp., was originally based in Toronto, Canada. Its North American division headquarters was relocated to the United States in the late 1980s to Boston, Massachusetts.

References

External links
 

Publishing companies established in 1949
1949 establishments in Germany
Academic publishing companies